The 1952 United States presidential election in Virginia took place on November 4, 1952. Voters chose 12 representatives, or electors to the Electoral College, who voted for president and vice president.

Virginia voted for the Republican nominee, General Dwight Eisenhower, over the Democratic nominee, Illinois Governor Adlai Stevenson. This election in particular marked a shift from Virginia being previously regarded as a safe blue state to more of a red state. Eisenhower ultimately won the national election with 55.18% of the vote. It was the first time Virginia voted for a Republican since it was won by Herbert Hoover in 1928.

This was also the first election after Colonial Heights was incorporated as an independent city. Eisenhower won Colonial Heights by a close margin of roughly three points. Eisenhower’s two victories in Colonial Heights of three points and four points in 1952 and 1956 remain the two lowest margins of victory for a Republican presidential candidate as of the 2020 election. In the decades since, Colonial Heights has established itself as one of the most Republican leaning independent cities in Virginia, and has yet to be won by a Democratic presidential candidate since its incorporation date.

Results

Results by county

References

Virgin
1952
1952 Virginia elections